This is a list of children's animated television series (including internet television series); that is, animated programs originally targeted towards audiences under the age of 18.

This list does not include Japanese, Chinese, or Korean series.

2020s

United States

United Kingdom

Canada

British

Co-productions

European

Canadian

French

Italian

Asia Pacific

Upcoming

References

Childrens
animated
Childrens 2020s
Childrens animated series
 2020s